W21DA-D, virtual and UHF digital channel 21, was a low-power Azteca América-affiliated television station serving Macon, Georgia, United States that was licensed to Dublin. The station was owned by HC2 Holdings.

W21DA-D's license was canceled by the Federal Communications Commission (FCC) on October 29, 2020 due to the station having been silent for more than two years.

Subchannels
The station's digital signal was multiplexed:

References

External links

W21DA-D
Low-power television stations in the United States
Television channels and stations established in 2015
2015 establishments in Georgia (U.S. state)
Defunct television stations in the United States
Television channels and stations disestablished in 2018
2018 disestablishments in Georgia (U.S. state)
21DA-D